Anthurium papillilaminum is a species of plant in the genus Anthurium native to Panama. A. papillilaminum grows terrestrially and has very dark green cordate leaves on short stems. A member of the section Cardiolonchium, it is closely related to other velvet-leaved Anthuriums, though it does not have silver veins on the leaves like Anthurium crystallinum.

The plant is an evergreen herbaceous perennial. Your care will determine its lifespan. They may live for years or they may die shortly if not properly cared for. Decorators and interior designers prefer its foliage beauty for magnificent interiors. It can be grown ideally in USDA hardiness zone 9b to 11.

References

papillilaminum
Endemic flora of Panama
Plants described in 1986